The Perpetuities and Accumulations Act 2009 (c. 18) is an Act of the Parliament of the United Kingdom that reforms the rule against perpetuities.

The Act resulted from a Law Commission report published in 1998. It abolishes the rule against perpetuities in most non-trust contexts, such as easements. In relation to wills, however, the Act only applies to wills drawn up after 6 April 2010. A will drawn up before 6 April but executed later (upon the death of the testator) will continue to be bound by prior rules.

Commencement
Sections 22 to 24 came into force on 12 November 2009

Sections 1 to 21 and the Schedule came into force on 6 April 2010.

See also
Perpetuities and Accumulations Act 1964

Notes

References

United Kingdom Acts of Parliament 2009
English trusts law